Emerik Beran (17 October 1868 – 10 March 1940) was a Slovenian composer and cellist of Czech descent. He educated numerous cellists in Ljubljana as a professor at the Conservatory from 1928 until 1936.

References

Slovenian classical composers
Slovenian male musicians
1868 births
1940 deaths
Slovenian cellists
Czech classical composers
Male classical composers
Czech cellists
Czech expatriates in Slovenia
19th-century classical composers
20th-century classical composers
20th-century Czech male musicians
19th-century Czech male musicians
20th-century cellists